Tania Gooley-Humphry (born 16 August 1973 in Adelaide, South Australia) is former professional beach volleyball and indoor volleyball player.

Gooley-Humphry began her indoor volleyball career at the University of New Mexico in 1991.

Prior to teaming up with Manser in August 1999, Gooley-Humphry had played alongside Nicole Sanderson from mid 1998. She began her international competitive beach volleyball career alongside Sarah Straton in 1996.

Gooley-Humphry competed in the women's tournament of the 2000 Summer Olympics alongside Pauline Manser. They finished fifth.

From 2002 she competed alongside Angela Clarke in a number of international grand slam and open competitions.

She is married with two daughters.

References

External links
 

1973 births
Living people
Australian women's beach volleyball players
Beach volleyball players at the 2000 Summer Olympics
Olympic beach volleyball players of Australia
Sportswomen from South Australia